L'Angélus may refer to:

 Château Angélus, the Bordeaux wine from the appellation Saint-Émilion
 L'Angelus, the French name for 1859 oil painting The Angelus by Jean-François Millet 
 L'Angélus (band), American band from Louisiana playing Cajun fiddle swing band

See also
 Angelus (disambiguation)